Virgin Machine (German: Die Jungfrauenmaschine) is a 1988 drama film, directed by Monica Treut. It is a co-production of Hyena Films with NDR.

Plot synopsis 
Dorothee Müller is a young journalist from Hamburg. She is eager for love, but frustrated by her relationships with men such as Heinz and Bruno, and sets out to unlock the secret to romantic love professionally, as a journalist, interviewing people from different professions. Failing to find the answers she seeks, she flies off to San Francisco. There, she meets several extraordinary women, and continues her quest to figure out love by interviewing them: Ramona, the drag king; Dominique, a Hungarian bohemian type; and Susie Sexpert, who owns a collection of incredible dildos. Dorothee's exploration leads her on a journey of self-exploration and adventure, and to new discoveries about her own sexuality.

Cast 
 Ina Blum – Dorothee Mueller
 Gad Klein – Heinz
 Marcelo Uriona – Bruno
 Shelly Mars – Ramona 
 Dominique Gaspar – Dominique
Susie Bright – Susie Sexpert

Style 
The film is shot in black and white, with punk styling and feminist aesthetic. The episodic presentation style chosen by Treut and the anarchistic spirit of the film have brought on comparisons to classics ranging from Jean-Luc Godard's Breathless to Lina Wertmueller to Susan Seidelman.

Release 
The film was originally released in 1988, when it screened in international festivals and was nominated for a Teddy Award. The film became something of a feminist underground classic, and has now been digitally remastered, and is being screened anew in such international venues as the 2017 Berlinale and 2019 TLVfest.

Reception 
In her review for The New York Times, Caryn James writes that Virgin Machine is "a blunt tribute to the not-revolutionary idea that lesbians can be lusty romantic fools just like anybody else." She gives mixed reviews to the style and content, concluding that the film is "more artsy than artistic, but at least Miss Treut is aiming for something stylish." In the Uncut film review of the 2017 Berlinale screening, the film is described as surprisingly sugary in light of its name and punk stylings. The review commends the renewed access to the film for a new generation of feminists, and says that Treut's treatment of sexuality in Virgin Machine is "open, cheerful and with a lot of fun; the women in the film go through life and are not only an inspiration for Dorothee Müller, but for all modern women."

Awards 
 1988: Torino Giovani Film Festival, Best Film
 1988: Torino Giovani Film Festival, Best Actress
 1988: Berlinale, Teddy Award (nomination)

Festivals 

 Toronto International Film Festival
 Berlinale 1988, 2017
London Gay & Lesbian Film Festival, 1998
 Créteil International Women's Film Festival
 Chéries-Chéris (Festival of Gays and Lesbians of Paris)
Turin Film Festival
 Gothenburg Film Festival
SQIFF
TLVFest 2019
Dublin International Film Festival, 2020

See also 

 List of LGBT-related films directed by women

References

External links 
 
 

1988 films
1980s German-language films
German LGBT-related films
Lesbian-related films
1980s German films